Joseph Williams Chalmers (December 20, 1806June 16, 1853) was a United States senator from Mississippi.

Biography 
Born in Halifax County, Virginia, he studied law in the University of Virginia at Charlottesville, and in Richmond. He was admitted to the bar and practiced.

He moved with his family to Jackson, Tennessee in 1835 and to Holly Springs, Mississippi in 1839, practicing law in both places. He followed the rapid expansion of the cotton industry in the Deep South.

Chalmers was appointed as vice chancellor of the northern Mississippi district in 1842 and 1843. He was appointed to and subsequently elected by the Mississippi legislature as a Democrat to the U.S. Senate to fill the vacancy caused by the resignation of Robert J. Walker, serving from November 3, 1845, to March 4, 1847. While in the Senate, Chalmers was chairman of the Committee on Engrossed Bills (29th United States Congress). He was the Uncle to Jefferson Davis and had the future Confederate General become a protege with him while studying law. (The Papers by Jefferson Davis 1841=1846)

Chalmers engaged in the practice of law in Holly Springs until his death in 1853; interment was in Hill Crest Cemetery.

His son James Ronald Chalmers was first elected in 1876 as a U.S. Representative from Mississippi's 6th congressional district, serving from 1877 to 1884. His term was interrupted in 1882, as his election in 1880 had been contested by John R. Lynch, his Republican opponent. Congress seated Lynch for the remainder of the term. In 1882 Chalmers won as an Independent Democrat.

References

1806 births
1853 deaths
People from Halifax County, Virginia
Democratic Party United States senators from Mississippi
Mississippi Democrats
Mississippi lawyers
University of Virginia School of Law alumni
19th-century American politicians
19th-century American lawyers